Elections to Ellesmere Port and Neston Borough Council were held on 1 May 2003. One third of the council was up for election and the Labour Party stayed in overall control of the council.

After the election, the composition of the council was:
Labour 31
Conservative 10
Liberal Democrat 2

Results

Ward results

References
2003 Ellesmere Port and Neston election result
 Ward results

2003 English local elections
2003
2000s in Cheshire